Constellation is the fourth studio album by Canadian singer-songwriter Jim Cuddy. It was released on January 26, 2018.

Reception
The lead track from the album, "While I Was Waiting", reached number 11 on CBC Radio 2's Top 20. Critical reception was generally positive, with Exclaim! reviewing the album as "even on otherwise average material, his vocal work is often astonishingly beautiful" and a continuation of "the consistency that has kept Cuddy from too many misfires over 30 years of songwriting".

Track listing
All songs written by Jim Cuddy.
"While I Was Waiting" – 4:36
"Where You Gonna Run" – 3:54
"Constellations" – 4:01
"Beauty and Rage" – 4:12
"Lonely When You Leave" – 4:04
"You Be the Leaver" – 4:25
"One Thing Right" – 5:44
"Hands on the Glass" – 4:40
"Cold Cold Wind" – 6:06
"Roses At Your Feet" – 3:23
"Things Still Left Unsaid" – 4:52

Personnel
Information adapted from official album credits, as per Jim Cuddy's official site.
Jim Cuddy – vocals and guitars
Colin Cripps – guitars and backing vocals
Anne Lindsay – violin and backing vocals
Bazil Donovan – bass
Joel Anderson – drums
Steve O'Connor – keyboards

Guest musicians
Michael Boguski – organ on "While I Was Waiting" and "Things Still Left Unsaid"
Jimmy Bowskill – mandolin on "Where You Gonna Run", "Lonely When You Leave", "One Thing Right", "Cold Cold Wind", "Things Still Left Unsaid"; pedal steel on "Hands on the Glass"
Amy Laing – cello on "Constellations" and "You Be the Leaver"
Oh Susanna – background vocals on "Cold Cold Wind" and "One Thing Right"

Charts

References

2018 albums
Jim Cuddy albums